Yolande Leacock (born 9 January 1991) is a Trinidadian female tennis player.

On 18 April 2011, Leacock reached her best singles ranking of world number 905. On 25 September 2017, she peaked at world number 678 in the doubles rankings.

Playing for Trinidad and Tobago at the Fed Cup, she has a win–loss record of 5–4.

Early life 
Leacock started playing tennis aged 8 and favourite Surface Hard.

Fed Cup participation

Singles

Doubles

References

External links 
 
 
 

1991 births
Living people
Trinidad and Tobago female tennis players